Bingbing or Bing-Bing or variant, may refer to:

People
Bingbing is a Chinese given name, and may refer to:

 Fan Bingbing, Chinese actress
 Li Bingbing, Chinese actress
 Wang Bingbing, Chinese ski mountaineer
 Pai Bing-bing (pinyin: Bái Bīngbīng), Taiwanese singer

Other uses
 "Bing Bing", a song from The ReVe Festival: Day 1 EP by Red Velvet
 Bing & Bing, apartment real estate developers in New York City

See also 

 
 
 Pingping (disambiguation)
 Bing (disambiguation)

Chinese given names